The 2010 AMA Pro American Superbike Championship was the 35th running of the AMA Superbike Championship, an American motorcycle racing championship. Title sponsors for the series include Sunoco, Amsoil, National Guard, Dunlop, Speedcom and SunTrust.

Josh Hayes won his first championship, becoming the first champion riding a Yamaha since 1991.

Superbike Season Calendar

Championship standings

Riders' Championship

Manufacturers' Championship

Entry list

See also
 2010 AMA Pro Supersport Championship season
 2010 AMA Pro Daytona Sportbike Championship

References

External links
The official website of the AMA Pro Racing Championship

Ama
AMA Superbike Championship seasons
Ama pro American